How to Walk Away is a 2015 novel and the debut novel of Australian novelist Lisa Birman. The work was first published on 1 February 2015 in the United States by Spuyten Duyvil Press. The novel centers on veteran Otis and his wife Cat, a genealogist. How to Walk Away is an exploration of post-traumatic stress disorder, obsessive compulsion, body integrity disorder, and the grief of keeping secrets born in war.

Synopsis
After three years in Afghanistan, Otis is adjusting to life back home. Struggling with post-traumatic stress disorder, he obsessively replays the traumas of war, cataloging the names of the dead. Cat, his wife, is a genealogist who makes maps of families in an attempt to understand her world. When a car accident takes Otis’s left arm, he is grateful to bear a physical loss that makes his damaged emotional self visible. As he recovers, he and Cat confront the silences upon which their marriage is built.

Author Biography
Lisa Birman is a poet and novelist. Her first novel, How to Walk Away was published by Spuyten Duyvil Press in 2015.

Birman is the author of the poetry collection For That Return Passage – a Valentine for the United States of America (Hollowdeck Press), and co-editor of the anthology Civil Disobediences: Poetics and Politics in Action (Coffee House Press). Her work has appeared in a wide range of well-respected poetry journals and she has published several chapbooks of poetry, including deportation poems and a trilogy of chapbooks in collaboration with Berlin-based singer/songwriter Josepha Conrad.

Birman has been teaching writing in the United States, Australia, and the Czech Republic for the past fifteen years. She served as the Director of the prestigious Summer Writing Program at Naropa University’s Jack Kerouac School of Disembodied Poetics for twelve years and continues to teach for the MFA in Creative Writing.

Originally from Melbourne, Australia, Birman moved to New York City via Seattle in 1995.  She moved to Boulder, Colorado in 1997 to pursue her MFA in Writing and Poetics. Now a dual citizen, she’s still Australian at heart and often trades the Colorado winter for a few months of Melbourne summer to spend time with her family.

Birman resides in Boulder, Colorado, where she works as a freelance writer and editor. She is the editor of a forthcoming collection of letters from Frances LeFevre to poet Anne Waldman, Dearest Annie, You wanted a report on Berkson’s class (Hanging Loose Press), and is currently completing her second novel.

Achievements

On March 17, 2016 Birman's novel was named a finalist, in the genre of literary fiction, by Colorado Humanities for their annual Colorado Book Awards., and on May 22, 2016 Birman's novel won the award for literary fiction.

Reviews
"How to Walk Away" starts at the return. Enveloped and interspersed with letter narration, the short and shorter sections of the book craft a psychological domestic journey in three acts from Otis’ isolation to a delayed reunion with his wife, Cat. Birman’s careful structure offers road signs for the reader travelling the confusion of the narrator’s consuming obsessions." - Chelsea Werner-Jatzke, The Conium Review' 

"Moment to moment we are with Otis as he tries to fit the pieces of himself back into the form called “normal.” We suffer his claustrophobia-along with his need to escape from his own thoughts." - Judith Podell, American Book Review

References

2015 Australian novels
2015 debut novels